Megalocoelacanthus dobiei is an extinct species of giant latimeriid coelacanth lobe-finned fish which lived during the Lower Campanian epoch until possibly the early Maastrichtian in the Late Cretaceous period in Appalachia, the Western Interior Seaway and Mississippi Embayment. Its disarticulated remains have been recovered from the Eutaw Formation, Mooreville Chalk Formation, and Blufftown Formation of Alabama, Mississippi, and Georgia, and also from the Niobrara Formation of Kansas.  Although no complete skeleton is known, careful examination of skeletal elements demonstrate it is closely related to the Jurassic-aged coelacanthid Libys. The species is named for herpetologist James L. Dobie. It has been estimated to have been 3.5—4.5 meters in length.

References 

Citations

 ; ;  1994: Giant fossil coelacanths of the Late Cretaceous in the eastern United States. Geology, 22(6): 503–506.
 ; ; ; ; ;  2012: The Giant Cretaceous Coelacanth (Actinistia, Sarcopterygii) Megalocoelacanthus dobiei Schwimmer, Stewart & Williams, 1994, and Its Bearing on Latimerioidei Interrelationships. PLoS ONE

Cretaceous bony fish
Prehistoric lobe-finned fish genera
Latimeriidae
Cretaceous animals of North America
Fossil taxa described in 1994